The Golan Subdistrict is an area administered by Israel as a subdistrict of Northern District. The subdistrict encompasses the Israeli-occupied territories of Golan Heights, occupied from Syria during the Six-day war and annexed to Israel under the Golan Heights Law. Thus this region is internationally recognized to encompass Quneitra Governorate, which itself is composed of 2 districts and 5 subdistricts.

Information
The largest city in the subdistrict, is the Syrian Druze town of Majdal Shams, with a population of 11 thousand. The largest Jewish settlement in the subdistrict is the town of Katzrin, with a population of 7 thousand. Most localities in the subdistrict - save Katzrin, the Druze towns of Buq'ata, Ein Qiniyye, Majdal Shams and Mas'ade, and the Alawite town of Ghajar - are organized in the Golan Regional Council.

References

External links
Municipality of Neve Pritzky

Northern District (Israel)